Presidential elections were held in Colombia on 25 May 2014. Since no candidate received 50% of the vote in the first round, a run-off between the two candidates with the most votes took place three weeks later on 15 June 2014. According to the official figures released by the National Registry office (Registraduría Nacional), as of 22 May 2014 (the cut-off date to register) 32,975,158 Colombians were registered and entitled to vote in the 2014 presidential election, including 545,976 Colombians resident abroad. Incumbent president Juan Manuel Santos was allowed to run for a second consecutive term. In the first round, Santos and Óscar Iván Zuluaga of the Democratic Center (Centro Democrático) were the two highest-polling candidates and were the contestants in the 15 June run-off. In the second round, Santos was re-elected president, gaining 51% of the vote compared with 45% for Zuluaga.

Candidates
By law the incumbent president Juan Manuel Santos had to declare before 25 November 2013 (six months before the election date) whether he would stand again for president. There had been speculation that he would not seek re-election: he had come under strong criticism during his first term for not continuing with the strong anti-terrorist measures of his predecessor Álvaro Uribe and for opening peace talks with the FARC guerrilla group, which drew fierce criticism from the still-popular Uribe and a large section of the public, resulting in low popularity ratings. Although his governing National Unity coalition still supported Santos in his re-election bid, there was speculation that other people would stand in his place, such as the Radical Change leader and experienced minister Germán Vargas Lleras, Vice President Angelino Garzón, and the retired head of the police force, General Oscar Naranjo. However, on 20 November Santos publicly declared his intention to stand for election again, citing a successful conclusion to the peace talks as one of the main factors for seeking a second term in office. His candidacy was supported unopposed by all three parties of the governing National Unity coalition: his own Social Party of National Unity, commonly known as "Party of the U"; the Colombian Liberal Party; and Radical Change. The following day Garzón said he would not seek reelection as Vice President in 2014. On 24 February 2014 Santos confirmed that Vargas Lleras would be his running mate for the 2014 election.

Unhappy with Santos' more conciliatory approach to the FARC, Álvaro Uribe had left the Party of the U to form the Democratic Center movement in January 2013 along with his former vicepresident Francisco Santos (cousin of president Juan Manuel Santos) and other close allies from the Party of the U. The Democratic Center's convention on 25–26 October 2013 chose economist and ex-minister Óscar Iván Zuluaga as its candidate for the presidential elections, ahead of Francisco Santos and Carlos Holmes Trujillo. On 28 February 2014 Trujillo was named as Zuluaga's vicepresidencial running mate.

The Colombian Conservative Party overwhelmingly chose Marta Lucía Ramírez to be its presidential candidate at its convention on 26 January 2014. Ramírez polled 1047 votes from the delegates, comfortably ahead of the other contenders Pablo Victoria with 138 votes and Álvaro Leyva with 84 votes. The convention was a fraught affair, with heated debate between some delegates arguing that the party should support the National Unity coalition and reelection of President Santos, and others who were in favour of the party fielding their own candidate. Ramírez was a defence minister in Álvaro Uribe's government, but left the Party of the U after Santos' election and rejoined the Conservative Party where she had begun her political career, becoming one of Santos' most vocal critics.

The main socialist opposition party, the Alternative Democratic Pole (PDA), had been split by infighting in the four years since the previous election. Its 2010 election candidate Gustavo Petro had acrimoniously left the party along with his followers after accusing the PDA's Samuel Moreno, then Mayor of Bogota, of corruption, a charge of which Moreno was later found guilty, and removed from his position and jailed. Petro formed the Progressives Movement (Movimiento Progresistas) in 2011 and successfully ran for Mayor of Bogota himself. Another faction of the PDA left to form the Patriotic Course (Marcha Patriótica) movement. The PDA was, however, the first party to confirm its candidate for the 2014 election, choosing its president and former caretaker Mayor of Bogotá Clara López Obregón at its third national congress on 9 November 2012.

The Green Party had also suffered serious divisions since its surprise second place in the 2010 election. The defeated 2010 presidential candidate Antanas Mockus had resigned from the Green Party in June 2011, opposed to the decision to accept Álvaro Uribe's support for the party's Bogotá mayoral candidate Enrique Peñalosa. On 25 September 2013, after a year of negotiations, the Fourth National Congress of the Green Party confirmed a union with the Progressives Movement of Bogotá mayor Gustavo Petro, with the new name Green Alliance. This new political alliance decided that its candidate for the 2014 elections would be chosen by a national vote on 9 March 2014, the same day as the parliamentary elections. On 21 November 2013 the Green Alliance confirmed that there were six pre-candidates for the position: former Bogotá mayor Enrique Peñalosa, senators John Sudarsky and Camilo Romero, ex-presidential candidate and former FARC hostage Ingrid Betancourt, the Progressives Movement spokesman Antonio Navarro, and indigenous leader Feliciano Valencia. Betancourt, Navarro and Valencia failed to reach the party's "10% recognition amongst Colombians" requirement to stand as a candidate, leaving Peñalosa, Sudarsky and Romero as the three remaining potential candidates. In the election on 9 March 2014 Enrique Peñalosa was elected as the Green Alliance's presidential candidate with 48% of the vote, comfortably ahead of Romero (17%) and Sudarsky (8%). On 18 March 2014 Peñalosa announced that his running mate would be Isabel Segovía, a former deputy minister of education in the Uribe government.

The far-left Patriotic Union party chose its former president Aída Avella to be its presidential candidate at its fifth national congress on 16 November 2013. Avella had just returned from 17 years in exile in Switzerland after fleeing Colombia in 1996 following an attempt on her life. However, the poor showing of the Patriotic Union in the parliamentary elections (where they failed to win a seat in either house of Congress) led to Avella abandoning her presidential campaign and instead agreeing to unite the Patriotic Front with the Alternative Democratic Pole as a single left-wing opposition alliance, with Avella becoming López's running mate for the presidential election.

Summary of candidates 
The following candidates appeared on the ballot for the first round in the following order:

Opinion polls

First round
The following table shows the results of opinion polls conducted from November 2013, when most of the presidential candidates had been confirmed, up to 15 May 2014. The table does not include the votes in the earliest polls for potential candidates who subsequently did not stand for election. The two highest scoring candidates in each poll (who would hypothetically go through to the second round of voting) are highlighted, except for the Centro Nacional de Consultoría poll of 17 January–7 February 2014, where Santos' score of 51% would have been enough to win in the first round.

A notable feature of the early polls was the high percentage of people intending to cast a blank vote (voto en blanco), usually between 20% and 30%. This reflected the widespread dissatisfaction among the Colombian public with all the candidates and the political system in general. After the parliamentary elections and the election of Peñalosa as candidate for the Green Alliance, both of which occurred on 9 March 2014, the polls showed a sharp drop in the percentage of people intending to cast a blank vote.

Second round

Results

By department

First round

Second round

References

Presidential elections in Colombia
Colombia
2014 in Colombia